Oleg Nikolayev (born 10 April 1968) is a Soviet boxer. He competed in the men's light welterweight event at the 1992 Summer Olympics.

References

1968 births
Living people
Soviet male boxers
Olympic boxers of the Unified Team
Boxers at the 1992 Summer Olympics
Place of birth missing (living people)
Light-welterweight boxers